Man Accused is a low budget 1959 British crime film.

Plot
Bob Jensen becomes engaged to Kathy, a baronet's daughter, but finds himself framed for murder and consequently imprisoned. He manages to break out of jail, and begins a search for the real killers.

Cast
Ronald Howard - Bob Jensen
Carol Marsh - Kathy
Ian Fleming - Sir Thomas
Catharina Ferraz - Anna
Robert Dorning - Beckett
Stuart Saunders - Curran 
Brian Nissen - Derek 
Kenneth Edwardes - Butler
Colin Tapley - Inspector
Howard Lang - Sergeant 
Gordon Needham - Constable
Graham Ashley - Warder

Critical reception
TV Guide wrote, "this poorly-made work follows every convention of its hackneyed wronged-man plot and ultimately offers nothing at all."

References

External links

1959 films
British crime films
1959 crime films
Films directed by Montgomery Tully
Films shot at New Elstree Studios
1950s English-language films
1950s British films